Kick Over the Traces is a compilation album by the American punk rock band Pinhead Gunpowder. The album contains tracks from Pinhead Gunpowder releases since the band formed in 1990. The album was released through Recess Records on June 16, 2009. The Japanese edition features a second disc recorded live at 924 Gilman Street on February 10, 2008, and features different cover art.

Track listing

Disc 1

Disc 2
All songs written Aaron Cometbus except where noted.

"Find My Place" - 1:06
"Cabot Gal" (Jason White) - 1:46
"I Used To" - 1:11
"New Blood" (Wilhelm Fink) - 1:29
"Buffalo" - 2:06
"Reach for the Bottle" - 1:50
"Backyard Flames" (Bill Schneider) - 2:10
"West Side Highway" - 2:31
"Losers of the Year" - 2:43
"On the Ave." - 2:51
"Kathleen" - 1:39
"Landlords" - 2:12
"Life During Wartime" - 1:55
"Anniversary Song" (Wilhelm Fink) - 1:45
"Before the Accident" - 1:42
"My Boot in Your Face Is What Keeps Me Alive" - 1:24
"Asheville" - 1:51
"MPLS Song" - 2:05
"Swan Song" - 1:49
"Beastly Bit" - 2:01
"Train Station" - 1:25
"Future Daydream" - 2:15
"Mahogany" (Michael Masser, Gerry Goffin) - 2:16

Personnel
Disc one
 Aaron Cometbus – drums
 Bill Schneider – bass
 Billie Joe Armstrong – guitar, producer
 Mike Kirsch - guitar on Tracks 2, 6, 10, 16, 17, 19
 Jason White – guitar
 Kevin Army – producer
 Pinhead Gunpowder - producer

Disc two
 Aaron Cometbus – drums
 Bill Schneider – bass, backing vocals
 Billie Joe Armstrong – guitar, vocals
 Jason White – guitar, vocals

References

2009 greatest hits albums
Pinhead Gunpowder albums